Erbauliche Monaths Unterredungen ("Edifying Monthly Discussions") was a German philosophy periodical issued from 1663 to 1668. Though the publication's scope tended to be narrow (the majority of its content was singly authored by Johann Rist, a theologian and poet from Hamburg), it inspired the creation of other similar magazines and led to an enthusiasm for education among its primarily intellectual audience. It is considered to be one of the earliest publications to resemble a modern magazine.

References

Defunct magazines published in Germany
German-language magazines
Magazines established in 1663
Magazines disestablished in 1668
Philosophy magazines
Monthly magazines published in Germany